Petar "Pero" Bukejlović (Serbian ; born 9 August 1946) was Prime Minister of Republika Srpska (10 January 2005 – 26 January 2006) after the resignation of Dragan Mikerević (December 17, 2004). He represented the Serbian Democratic Party.

1946 births
Living people
People from Doboj
Serbs of Bosnia and Herzegovina
Prime ministers of Republika Srpska
Serb Democratic Party (Bosnia and Herzegovina) politicians